Goethe Memorial may refer to:
 Goethe Monument (Berlin), Berlin, Germany
 Goethe–Schiller Monument, Germany
 Goethe–Schiller Monument (Milwaukee) in Milwaukee, Wisconsin, United States